Durgapur Lok Sabha constituency was one of the 543 parliamentary constituencies in India. The constituency centred on Durgapur in West Bengal. The seat was reserved for scheduled castes.

As a consequence of the order of the Delimitation Commission in respect of the delimitation of constituencies in the West Bengal, this parliamentary constituency ceased to exist from 2009; some of the assembly segments under this constituency will be part of a new Bardhaman-Durgapur Lok Sabha constituency,  others will be part of Bishnupur Lok Sabha constituency.

This page also includes results for Ausgram Lok Sabha constituency during the short period of its existence from 1962 to 1971.

Assembly segments
Durgapur Lok Sabha constituency was composed of the following assembly segments:
 Gangajalghati (SC) (assembly constituency no. 249)
 Barjora (assembly constituency no. 250)
 Sonamukhi (SC) (assembly constituency no. 256)
 Durgapur I (assembly constituency no. 264)
 Durgapur II (assembly constituency no. 265)
 Kanksa (SC) (assembly constituency no. 266)
 Galsi (assembly constituency no. 269)

Members of Parliament

For Members of Parliament from this area in subsequent years see Bardhaman Purba Lok Sabha constituency and Bardhaman-Durgapur Lok Sabha constituency.

Election results

General election 2004

General election 1999

General election 1998

General elections 1962-2004 
Most of the contests were multi-cornered. However, only winners and runners-up are generally mentioned below:

 * Results for Ausgram constituency

See also
 List of Constituencies of the Lok Sabha

References

Former Lok Sabha constituencies of West Bengal
Politics of Paschim Bardhaman district
Politics of Purba Bardhaman district
Politics of Bankura district
Durgapur, West Bengal
Former constituencies of the Lok Sabha
2008 disestablishments in India
Constituencies disestablished in 2008